The Texas Wing of the Civil Air Patrol (TXWG) is the highest echelon of Civil Air Patrol in the state of Texas. Texas Wing headquarters are located in Nacogdoches, Texas. The Texas Wing consists of over 2,900 cadet and adult members at over 70 locations across the state of Texas.

Mission
The Texas Wing, along with the Civil Air Patrol as a whole, has three primary missions: emergency services, cadet programs and aerospace education.

Emergency services

Emergency services provided by the Texas Wing of CAP include search and rescue, disaster relief, and humanitarian services. Texas CAP members have provided assistance in border patrol operations, search and rescue missions, and drug interdiction missions.

In 2020, the Texas Wing was activated to assist in Texas' response to the COVID-19 pandemic. Pilots with the Texas Wing flew lab samples from across the state to a laboratory in Austin to be tested for the coronavirus.

Cadet programs
Texas runs a cadet program, which is organized among military lines and emphasizes Air Force traditions and values. Every summer and winter, CAP cadets from Texas and other wings may sign up for a training course located at the Texas Wing Civil Air Patrol Encampment at various military bases around Texas where cadets study military customs and courtesies, military drill, aerospace, and future opportunities in Civil Air Patrol.

Aerospace education
The CAP provides education for both CAP members and the general public, including education provided through the education system. Teachers can join CAP as Aerospace Education Members (AEM) and access resources available through the CAP, the Air Force, and NASA.

Organization
The Texas Wing of the Civil Air Patrol is organized into squadrons, which are assigned into one of seven groups, based on their geographical location.

See also
Texas Air National Guard
Texas State Guard

References

External links
TXWG Official Website

Wings of the Civil Air Patrol
Education in Texas
Military in Texas